Orlando Bruno Román (born November 28, 1978) is a Puerto Rican professional baseball pitcher. He has played in the Chinese Professional Baseball League (CPBL) for the Brother Elephants in 2010 and 2011, the Lamigo Monkeys in 2016, and the Chinatrust Brothers in 2017, and in Nippon Professional Baseball for the Tokyo Yakult Swallows from 2012 to 2015.

Career
Román attended Indian Hills Community College and was drafted by the New York Mets in the 31st round (946th overall) of the 1999 Major League Baseball draft. He played in the Mets' minor league organization through 2006, reaching Triple-A. He pitched in the minor league systems of the Baltimore Orioles in 2007 and the Toronto Blue Jays in 2008. Román also pitched for the Pericos de Puebla of the Mexican League in 2007, 2008 and 2009. Román was a mid-season all-star in 2008 and 2009. In 2010, Román signed with the Brother Elephants of the Chinese Professional Baseball League and played for the team in 2011 as well. On January 14, 2012, Román signed with the Tokyo Yakult Swallows of Nippon Professional Baseball. In 4 seasons with the Swallows, Román pitched to an 18–22 record with a 3.00 ERA and 207 strikeouts in 324.0 innings pitched over 133 total games. Román became a free agent after the 2015 season. Román signed with the Lamigo Monkeys of the Chinese Professional Baseball League for the 2016 season. On April 1, 2017, Román signed with the Chinatrust Brothers of the Chinese Professional Baseball League.

International career
Román has appeared in the four editions of the World Baseball Classic (2006, 2009, 2013, 2017) for team Puerto Rico. At the 2017 World Baseball Classic, he was the starting pitcher against Dominican Republic in the second round.

Personal life
On May 29, 2019, Román and former professional baseball player Ángel Pagán were rescued at sea off the coast of Puerto Rico after a 15-foot wave caused their boat to capsize.

References

External links

Living people
1978 births
2006 World Baseball Classic players
2009 World Baseball Classic players
2013 World Baseball Classic players
2017 World Baseball Classic players
Baseball players at the 2019 Pan American Games
Pan American Games gold medalists for Puerto Rico
Pan American Games medalists in baseball
Gulf Coast Mets players
Pittsfield Mets players
Puerto Rican expatriate baseball players in Taiwan
Brother Elephants players
CTBC Brothers players
Indian Hills Falcons baseball players
Puerto Rican expatriate baseball players in Japan
Sportspeople from Bayamón, Puerto Rico
Tokyo Yakult Swallows players
Capital City Bombers players
Kingsport Mets players
Lamigo Monkeys players
Brooklyn Cyclones players
St. Lucie Mets players
Binghamton Mets players
Norfolk Tides players
Bowie Baysox players
New Hampshire Fisher Cats players
Criollos de Caguas players
Medalists at the 2019 Pan American Games
Liga de Béisbol Profesional Roberto Clemente pitchers
Survivors of seafaring accidents or incidents
Pericos de Puebla players
Naranjeros de Hermosillo players
Yaquis de Obregón players
Puerto Rican expatriate baseball players in Mexico